Grit City Grass is a Bluegrass band located in Crozet, Virginia. The band is made up of four musicians who play a wide range of traditional instruments and their recordings receive regular airplay on Bluegrass Sunday Morning on WNRN.

Members 
 Zeek Shifflett - guitar, lead vocal
 Fred Anderson - mandolin, dobro, lead and backup vocal
 J.W. Brown - upright bass, lead and tenor vocal
 Liza Flood - fiddle, backup vocal
 Brandon Johnson - banjo, lead and backup vocal

Recordings 
The band recorded two self-produced albums:
 Rumble Of The Rails
 Days We Turned to Years

Awards 
 Fred Anderson - First place, dobro, VFMA Festival
 J.W. Brown - First place, male vocal, VFMA Festival
 J.W. Brown - Judge's Award, two years in a row, Maury River Fiddler's Convention
 Liza Flood - Winner, fiddle contest, Rocky Grass Bluegrass Festival
 Grit City Grass - First place, Maury River Fiddler’s Convention
 Grit City Grass - First place, VFMA Festival

References

American bluegrass music groups